The Kenner Flur in the northwest of Kenn is a nature reserve in Trier, Rhineland-Palatinate, which was formed on July 7, 1989 by ordinance of the Trier district authority . The size is 31.4 hectares, includes parts of the Ruwer-Paulin district and is located on the Moselle. Protection goals are the preservation of the bank and water structures typical of the Moselle floodplain, including the associated plant communities as a habitat for endangered insects and amphibians. The area also serves as a nursery for bird species such as the great crested grebe, sand martin and little ringed plover and as a resting place during bird migration.
The Kennerbach flows into the Moselle at the eastern end of the Kenner Flur.

Naming
The Kenner Flur was formerly part of the municipality of Kenn. In 1969, the Kenner Flur was incorporated into the city of Trier.

Pictures

References 

Nature reserves in Germany